Euhystricia is a genus of parasitic flies in the family Tachinidae. There are at least two described species in Euhystricia.

Species
These two species belong to the genus Euhystricia:
 Euhystricia cussiliris Reinhard, 1953
 Euhystricia nigra Townsend, 1914

References

Further reading

 
 
 
 

Tachinidae
Articles created by Qbugbot